Waynesburg, is an unincorporated community in Decatur County, Indiana, in the United States.

History
Waynesburg was laid out in 1844. Waynesburg had a post office between 1854 and 1902.

References

Unincorporated communities in Decatur County, Indiana
Unincorporated communities in Indiana